Lee Manuel Ossie (born July 18, 1968) is a Liberian former professional boxer. Nicknamed "Destroyer", Ossie is a former European Union light heavyweight and African heavyweight champion.

Professional career
On August 26, 2005 Manuel upset title contender Adewale Abbey to win the African Boxing Union heavyweight title.

Ossie lost to undefeated American Chris Arreola. The bout was televised on ESPN.

References

External links

Heavyweight boxers
1968 births
Living people
Liberian male boxers
Cruiserweight boxers
African Boxing Union champions
Light-heavyweight boxers
Sportspeople from Monrovia